José Ignacio Rodriguez Meléndez (1931 in Vigo, Spain – December 12, 1999 in Buenos Aires, Argentina) was an Argentine actor.

He died on December 12, 1999 in Buenos Aires, Argentina, from cancer

Selected filmography
1959 - I Was Born in Buenos Aires
1962 - Rumbos malditos (unreleased)
1965 - Los Guerrilleros ... Bruno
1967 - En la selva no hay estrellas ... Man
1968 - Digan lo que digan ... Miguel
1968 - Asalto a la ciudad ... Julian
1970 - Joven, viuda y estanciera
1971 - Bajo el signo de la Patria ... General Manuel Belgrano
1973 - The Bad Life
1974 - The Great Adventure
1976 - Where the Wind Dies
1978 - Broken Comedy
1979 - Este loco amor loco
1979 - Contragolpe
1988 - Peculiar Attraction
1989 - Eversmile, New Jersey ... The Boss

References

External links

1931 births
1999 deaths
People from Vigo
Spanish emigrants to Argentina
Deaths from cancer in Argentina
Burials at La Chacarita Cemetery
20th-century Argentine male actors